Paulette Libermann (14 November 1919 – 10 July 2007) was a French mathematician, specializing in differential geometry.

Early life and education
Libermann was one of three sisters born to a family of Russian-Ukrainian Yiddish-speaking Jewish immigrants to Paris.

After attending the Lycée Lamartine, she began her university studies in 1938 at the École normale supérieure de jeunes filles, a college in Sèvres for training women to become school teachers. Due to the reforms of the new director Eugénie Cotton, who wanted her school to be at the same level of École Normale Supérieure, Libermann benefited from being taught by leading mathematicians as Élie Cartan, Jacqueline Ferrand and André Lichnerowicz.

Two years later, upon completion of her studies, she was prevented from taking the agrégation and becoming a teacher because of the anti-Jewish laws instituted by the German occupation. However, thanks to a scholarship provided by Cotton, she began doing research under Cartan's supervision.

In 1942, she and her family escaped Paris for Lyon, where they hid from the persecutions by Klaus Barbie for two years. After the liberation of Paris in 1944, she returned to Sèvres and completed her studies, obtaining the agrégation.

Career
Libermann taught briefly in a school at Douai, and then got a scholarship to study at Oxford University between 1945 and 1947, where she obtained a bachelor's degree under the supervision of J. H. C. Whitehead.

From 1947 to 1951 she hold a teaching position at a school for girls in Strasbourg. However, at the encouragement of Élie Cartan, during this period she also continued her research at Université Louis Pasteur.
	
In 1951 she left teaching for a research position at the Centre national de la recherche scientifique, and in 1953 she completed her doctoral thesis, entitled Sur le problème d’équivalence de certaines structures infinitésimales [On the equivalence problem of certain infinitesimal structures], under the supervision of Charles Ehresmann.

After her PhD, Libermann was appointed assistant professor at the University of Rennes in 1954 and full professor at the same university in 1958. In 1966 she moved to the University of Paris, and when the university split in 1968, she joined Paris Diderot University, from which she retired in 1986.

Research 
Libermann's research involved many different aspects of differential geometry and global analysis. In particular, she worked on G-structures and Cartan's equivalence method, Lie groupoids and Lie pseudogroups, higher-order connections, and contact geometry.

In 1987 she wrote together with Charles-Michel Marle one of the first textbooks on symplectic geometry and analytical mechanics.

Selected publications

References

1919 births
2007 deaths
20th-century French Jews
French mathematicians
Women mathematicians
Differential geometers
20th-century French women scientists